Dercas verhuelli, the tailed sulphur, is a small butterfly of the family Pieridae, that is, the yellows and whites, which is found in India, Burma, China and Indochina.

See also
List of butterflies of India (Pieridae)

References
 
  
 
 
 

Coliadinae
Butterflies of Asia
Butterflies of Indochina
Butterflies described in 1839